Big Whiskey & the GrooGrux King is the seventh studio album by Dave Matthews Band, which was released by RCA Records on June 2, 2009.

It is the band's first release since the death of saxophonist LeRoi Moore. Guitarist Tim Reynolds played on the album, marking his first recording with DMB since 1998's Before These Crowded Streets. Rashawn Ross makes his first appearance on a DMB studio album since joining as a regular touring member in 2006 as well as Jeff Coffin, who has taken Moore's role since June 2008. The album was the first to be produced by Rob Cavallo.

The album debuted at number one on the Billboard 200, selling 424,000 copies in its first week of release. This marked the group's fifth consecutive studio album to open with a sales week of at least 400,000 copies.

Exactly six months after its release, Big Whiskey & the GrooGrux King was nominated for two Grammy Awards: Best Rock Album and Album of the Year, but lost to Green Day's 21st Century Breakdown and Taylor Swift's Fearless, respectively.

Recording
Work on the album began in November 2007 at Haunted Hollow in Charlottesville, Virginia. Production moved to Seattle, Washington in February 2008 at Studio Litho, and continued from October to December 2008 at Studio X. In January 2009 the sessions that would complete the album began at Piety Street Studio in New Orleans, Louisiana.

The album was originally slated to be released on April 14, 2009, but it was moved to June 2. The title of the album was announced on February 26, 2009.

The album cover was fully revealed on April 13.  In the previous four days, sections of the cover were slowly revealed; the cover was divided into nine pieces and revealed one piece a day for the first several days, and then several pieces the last two days before the final reveal.  The art was ultimately revealed by shuffling the pieces in a digital sliding puzzle, where the person has to rearrange the puzzle correctly.  Once correct, the center piece was revealed to show the full picture.

Title
In an April 2009 interview with MTV, Dave Matthews and Carter Beauford described the origins of the two-pronged name of the album.

Beauford described the word "GrooGrux" as not only a nickname for LeRoi Moore, but also a nickname for himself, Tim Reynolds, and former collaborator Tim Wicks. Beauford said the made-up word was used to describe the "vibe" and "energy" of their "wild-sounding rhythms" they made when they started playing music together. Beauford also mentioned that Matthews, bassist Stefan Lessard and violinist Boyd Tinsley were now graduates of "The GrooGrux Academy."

Matthews said the origins of "Big Whiskey" came from a chance encounter with a local New Orleans drunk during a photo shoot for the new album. When the band was shooting promotional photos outside of Preservation Hall in the French Quarter of New Orleans, they encountered a local man playing harmonica who was asking tourists for money so he could buy "a big whiskey." Lessard gave Matthews a $20 bill to hand the man, who walked off in celebration. Trumpet player Rashawn Ross then suggested the phrase for the title of the album, which Matthews liked because people would not have to call the album by the more difficult to say "GrooGrux".

Critical reception 

Rolling Stone called Big Whiskey and the GrooGrux King the band's "best album yet" on the cover of their June 2009 issue, and editor David Fricke awarded the album a rating of four out of five stars.

Track listing

The track listing was made available on April 14 on the Dave Matthews Band website, and the first single from the album, "Funny the Way It Is", was made available for free download on the Dave Matthews Band website for the week of 14 April 2009.

Little Red Bird and bonus songs

Little Red Bird
With the super deluxe boxed set version of the album, the band included Little Red Bird, a four-track EP of songs that were recorded during the sessions, but were not included on the final cut.

European CD bonus songs
The European cut of Big Whiskey featured two extra songs after "You and Me": "Write a Song," from the Little Red Bird EP, and "Corn Bread," a song the band had been playing live for two tours. The studio version of "Corn Bread" features guest banjoist Danny Barnes.

"Corn Bread" and "#27" are the only released songs from the sessions that the band had played live before the sessions began.

iTunes bonus songs
iTunes released two versions of Big Whiskey: a standard version containing the 13 tracks from the album plus a live version of "Corn Bread", and a more expensive iTunes pass. The pass included videos, exclusive live tracks, and a few songs from the album that were released ahead of the official release date. The pass was active from April 21, 2009 until September 22, 2009, and tracks were automatically downloaded as they became available.  On September 9, with the release of iTunes 9, came the Big Whiskey LP, where one can play the music while reading the lyrics, as well as new art by Dave Matthews.

Personnel
Dave Matthews Band
Carter Beauford – drums, percussion
Stefan Lessard – bass guitar
Dave Matthews – guitar, vocals
LeRoi Moore – saxophone
Boyd Tinsley – violin

Featured musicians
Tim Reynolds – guitar
Rashawn Ross – trumpet
Jeff Coffin – saxophone

Additional musicians
Danny Barnes – banjo
Rob Cavallo – occasional organ and piano
Joe Lawlor – additional guitar
Jamie Muhoberac – keyboards, organ
Tim Pierce – additional guitar
Roger Joseph Manning Jr. – keyboards
Mr. Okra – produce vendor
Strings
Joel Derouin – concertmaster
Charlie Bisharat, Jacqueline Brand, Roberto Cani, Susan Chatman, Mario de Leon, Alan Grunfeld, Gerardo Hilera, Sharon Jackson, Natalie Leggett, Sid Page, Alyssa Park, Vladimir Polimatidi, Michele Richards, Philip Vaiman, Josefina Vergara, Laurence Greenfield, Miwako Watanabe – violin
Andrew Duckles , Robert Brophy, Victoria Miskolczy, Karen Elaine, Matt Funes, Darrin McCann – viola
Steve Richards , Chris Ermacoff, Suzie Katayama , Armen Ksajikian, Dane Little, George Kim Scholes, Rudolph Stein – cello
Nico Abondolo , Timothy Eckert – bass

Production
Rob Cavallo – producer
Doug McKean – engineer
Lars Fox, Dan Chase – Pro Tools engineers
Wesley Fontenot, Rob Evans, Floyd Reitsma, Sam Hofstedt, Josh Evans, Paul Suarez, Steve Rea, Russ Waugh, Aaron Walk – assistant engineers
David Campbell – string arrangements and conducting (6, 8, 12)
Chris Lord-Alge – mixing (1, 2)
Doug McKean – mixing (3-13)
Keith Armstrong, Nik Karpen – assistant mix engineers (1, 2)
Brad Townsend – additional mix engineering (1, 2)
Ted Jensen – mastering
Henry Luniewski – drum tech
Jerry Johnson – drum and saxophone tech
Craig Baker – guitar tech
Erik Porter – bass and violin tech
Dave Matthews – illustration and art direction

Charts

Notes

References

2009 albums
Albums produced by Rob Cavallo
Dave Matthews Band albums